Albert Gustaf Aristides Edelfelt (21 July 1854 – 18 August 1905) was a Finnish-Swedish painter noted for his naturalistic style and Realist approach to art. He lived in the Grand Duchy of Finland and made Finnish culture visible abroad, before Finland gained full independence.

Biography

Early life
Edelfelt was born 1854 in Porvoo, son of the Swedish architect Carl Albert Edelfelt (1818–1869),who had lived in Finland since his early youth, and Alexandra Edelfeldt, born Alexandra Brandt 1833–1901). His father died when he was still young, and his mother had to raise him and his younger siblings alone compounded by financial difficulties. He was very close with his mother throughout his life.

He began his formal studies of art in 1869 at the Drawing School of the Finnish Art Society in Helsinki  and continued as a student of Adolf von Becker (1871–73). He then received a scholarship from the Finnish government to study history painting at the Royal Academy of Fine Arts in Antwerp, Belgium. He studied under Nicaise de Keyser, and won an award for excellence for his painting of Alexander the Great on his deathbed. He also began a long-lasting friendship with the Belgian artist Émile Claus.

Arrival in Paris – History Painting 
In the autumn of 1894, at the age of nineteen, he moved to Paris and enrolled at the Ecole des Beaux-Arts. He shared a small studio with a Finnish friend at 24 Rue Bonaparte. Under the instruction of the French painter Jean-Léon Gerome he continued to focus on history painting, particularly scenes of the long series of wars involving the Russians, Swedes and Finns.

After a year in Paris he returned to Helsinki, but came back to Paris in 1876, taking a studio at 81 boulevard du Montparnasse. He became friends with the painter Jules Bastien-Lepage, who introduced him the techniques of painting in open air. His major work of this time was "Duke Charles IX of Sweden insulting the corpse of his enemy Klaus Fleming" (1878). This work which blended the formal academic style with elements of careful realism, such as the dust on the boots. This painting did not cause a stir in Paris, but it enjoyed a great success in Finland; it was purchased by the Finish Society of Fine Arts. 

In 1879 he had his first success at the Paris Salon, with a history painting entitled "The Burnt Village - a scene from the Finnish peasant revolt of 1596". The French critics praised the realism of the figures, but Edelfelt noticed the incongruity between the historical figures and the realistic outdoor setting. He wrote, "The problem right with historic subjects is that one cannot render the aspect of reality as in scenes that you have seen yourself."  With that judgement, he almost entirely abandoned history painting and concentrated on painting in the open air.

He went back to Finland for a time, then returned to Paris in 1881 and rented a new studio at 147 avenue des Villiers.

Impressionism and Painting in Open Air
In the early 1880s, Edelfelt began to adapt some of the characteristics of the new Impressionist movement; natural settings, particularly parks and gardens and the seashore;  intimate domestic settings; the play of light on the figures; and rapid execution, to capture the sensation of the moment. At the same time he never became entirely an impressionist, following his realist training to concentrate on precise details and using a broad and complex palette of colors. 

Throughout the 1880s, Edelfelt continued to paint outdoor scenes of life in Paris, displaying his talent for capturing the effects of light, combined with his precision of details. During the same period he created wide variety of intimate domestic scenes, capturing the details of Parisian life.

Portrait of Louis Pasteur 
In 1880 Edelfelt became a friend of Jean-Baptiste Pasteur, the son of the famous chemist Louis Pasteur who introduced him to Pasteur the following year. He became a close friend of family, and painted many of their portraits over the following years. Pasteur had a good sense of public relations, and participated with Edelfelt in the planning of his own portrait.

Edelfeld's portrait of Pasteur in his laboratory, painted in 1885, had a great success at the Paris Salon of 1886, and became one of the most familiar images of the scientist. It gained the painter the award of the Legion of Honor when he was only thirty-five years old.

Russian Imperial commissions
Edelfelt began by painting portraits of his family and relatives, but his skills very quickly brought him a large clientele. In 1881 he visited Saint Petersburg, where the Russian Academy had awarded him an honorary membership in 1878. The Grand Duke Vladimir, brother of the Russian Emperor, commissioned him to make portraits of his children. This led to another commission to paint the children of Czar Alexander III of Russia. In 1896 he returned to Russia to make a portrait of Czar Nicholas II.

In February, 1899, Czar Nicholas II issued a decree suppressing the political liberties of the Finns. Edelfelt mobilised a network of Finnish artists and cultural figures with a petition to the Russian government, called "Pro Finlandia", seeking recognition of the independence of the arts in Finland. He also took on the role of a cultural diplomat as the commissioner of the Finnish participation in the Paris Exposition Universelle (1900).

The Finnish Countryside
Edelfelt spent his summers in Finland exploring and painting. While his French paintings were almost all of Paris scenes, his paintings in Finland captured the scenery, people and particular light of the Finnish countryside. He presented them regularly at the Paris Salon. For his painting of an outdoor church service on the coast at Hakko, he made a series of oil sketches, to capture exactly the tonalities of the water and the sky.

In 1880 his family bought a summer house at the coastal town of Hakko, in the southwest part the country. and he installed a studio there in 1883. He frequently used his family and local residents as models. His pictures have a spontaneity and naturalness resulting from his careful observation and empathy for the subjects.

Portrait painting 
Edelfelt very early in his career became a master of portrait painting, which provided the major part of his income. "Portraits for the soup, paintings for the glory," he wrote in 1878, citing the Belgian artist Antoine Wiertz.  From 1880 onwards, he participated in the Paris Salon, and portraits were his major source of income.
 
Each portrait he painted involved a lengthy process. He had a series of preparatory drawings with pencil and crayon, then with pastel colors, before making the final oil painting. Besides close attention to the expression of the model and the pose, he paid close attention to the surroundings of the subject, including books, pets or objects that could illuminate the personality of the subject. 

While he painted portraits of influential and famous people such as Pasteur, many of his best portraits are not posed, but depict Finnish men and women in natural settings, in village life or at sea.

Espagnolisme, Runeberg and religious art
In April and May 1881, Edelfelt spent five weeks in Spain where he learned many new aspects of art and studied the phenomenon called espagnolisme, which is the impact that Spanish influences had on France starting from the 1830s. In Spain, Edelfelt also gained a deeper grasp of Gypsy culture and Orientalism which had always interested him. His most important picture from Granada is Gitana Dancing I, a genre portrait of a dancing Gypsy girl.

Edelfelt admired the poet Johan Ludvig Runeberg, who was a friend of the family. The company of Runeberg had a lasting impact on Edelfelt, who from time to time turned to scenes from Finnish history in his paintings. Edelfelt went on to illustrate Runeberg's epic poem The Tales of Ensign Stål.

Edelfelt also later dabbled in religious painting, and in his 1890 Christ and Mary Magdalene he set a biblical scene in the Finnish landscape, influenced by Kanteletar.

Personal life 

He sent his mother hundreds of letters when he was away. In Paris, he shared a studio with the American Julian Alden Weir, who introduced him to John Singer Sargent. He had romantic relationships with numerous women, including Antonia Bonjean and Virginie in Paris. He married Baroness Anna Elise "Ellan" de la Chapelle in 1888, and the same year they had one child, Erik. They had known each other since childhood, but their marriage did not have a lot of warmth. The death of his mother in 1901 affected him greatly.

He died abruptly from heart failure in 1905 at the age of fifty-one. His funeral was attended by a large number of notable Finns. His son Erik died not long afterwards in 1910.

Legacy

In 2013, Boys Playing on the Shore (1884) was selected by Nordic Moneta as Finland's most significant painting.

In Finland, he was one of the founders of the Realist art movement. He influenced several younger Finnish painters and helped fellow Finnish artists such as Akseli Gallen-Kallela and Gunnar Berndtson to make their breakthrough in Paris.  Among his students was Léon Bakst. Edelfelt was one of the first Finnish artists to achieve international fame. Albert Edelfelt is considered one of the most notable artists of the Golden Age of Finnish Art. A museum under his name operates in Porvoo. He was selected as the main motif on a Finnish commemorative coin celebrating the 150th anniversary of his birth, the €100 Albert Edelfelt and painting commemorative coin, minted in 2004. The reverse shows an embossed face of the artist.

See also

Golden Age of Finnish Art
Art in Finland

Bibliography
Pommereau, Claude (Chief Editor), "Albert Edelfelt – Lumières de Finlande" (in French), February 2022, BeauxArts & Cie Editions. ISBN 979-1-02040-725-2.

References

External links

  Albert Edelfelt Studio Museum (Artist's Studio Museum Network)

1854 births
1905 deaths
People from Porvoo
People from Uusimaa Province (Grand Duchy of Finland)
Swedish-speaking Finns
Recipients of the Legion of Honour
19th-century Finnish painters
Finnish male painters
Burials at Hietaniemi Cemetery
19th-century Finnish male artists